Noxolo is a Southern African female given name. It is also a surname.

People with the given name
Noxolo Kiviet, South African politician
Noxolo Maqashalala (1977 – 2021), South African actress 
Noxolo Mathula (born 1993), South African actress, model, and musician
Noxolo Nogwaza (1987 – 2011), South African LGBT rights activist

People with the surname
Patricia Noxolo, British geographer

African given names